There are 30 stadiums in use by Major League Baseball (MLB) teams. The oldest ballpark is Fenway Park in Boston, home of the Boston Red Sox, which opened in 1912. The newest stadium is Globe Life Field in Arlington, Texas, home of the Texas Rangers, which opened in 2020. Two ballparks were built in the 1910s, three in the 1960s, one in the 1970s, one in the 1980s, seven in the 1990s, twelve in the 2000s, three in the 2010s, and one in the 2020s. Twenty-five ballparks have natural grass surfaces, while five have artificial turf. Eight ballparks do not have corporate naming rights deals: Angel Stadium, Dodger Stadium, Fenway Park, Kauffman Stadium,  Nationals Park, Oriole Park at Camden Yards, Wrigley Field, and Yankee Stadium.

Stadiums

Future and proposed ballparks

Notes

See also

 List of former Major League Baseball stadiums
 List of Major League Baseball spring training stadiums
 List of U.S. baseball stadiums by capacity
 List of U.S. stadiums by capacity
 List of baseball parks by capacity
 List of Nippon Professional Baseball stadiums 
 List of current National Football League stadiums
 List of National Hockey League arenas
 List of Major League Soccer stadiums
 List of National Basketball Association arenas

References

Further reading

External links

 Ballparks. Munsey & Suppes
 Ballpark Digest. August Publications
 Ballparks of Baseball—The Fields of Major League Baseball
 BaseballParks.com. Joe Mock. Grand Slam Enterprises, Inc.
 Clem's Baseball—Our National Pastime—& Its "Green Cathedrals". Andrew G. Clem

 01
Stadiums
Lists of baseball stadiums in the United States